The 1929 Holland with Boston by-election was a by-election held on 21 March 1929 for the House of Commons constituency of Holland with Boston in Lincolnshire.

The by-election was caused by the death of the town's Unionist Member of Parliament, Arthur Dean; who had held the seat at the 1924 general election. At that election, Labour came second and the Liberals finished third.  Labour had won the seat in 1918, but it had been gained by the Unionists at a by-election just before the 1924 general election.

Candidates 
The new Unionist candidate chosen to defend the seat was Frederick J. Van den Berg. He was born and raised in Johannesburg, before moving to London to practise as a Barrister in 1916. He was standing as a candidate for the first time.
The Labour candidate was George Blanco White, a  lawyer who had stood here last time. The Liberals chose a new candidate in James Blindell a Managing Director of a Boot Manufacturing business.
The election was marked by the presence of an Agricultural Party candidate, F.W. Dennis.

Campaign
On 1 March, nationally, Liberal leader, David Lloyd George launched the Liberal programme for the upcoming general election, titled We Can Conquer Unemployment.
On the eve of poll, the voters of Eddisbury elected a Liberal in place of a Unionist.

Result 
The result was a victory for the Liberal Party candidate James Blindell, who overturned a Unionist majority of 4,770 to win by a majority of 3,706 votes.

Aftermath
A General election followed in a matter of months. Blindell held the seat for the Liberals, with Van den Berg again standing for the Unionists, finishing second. White did not stand again and the new Labour candidate dropped to third place. The Agricultural Party did not contest the seat. 
This was the last by-election gain for the Liberal Party until the 1958 Torrington by-election.

See also 
 Holland with Boston constituency
 1924 Holland with Boston by-election
 1937 Holland with Boston by-election
 List of United Kingdom by-elections (1918–1931)

References

Sources 
 

Holland with Boston by-election
Holland with Boston by-election
Holland with Boston by-election
By-elections to the Parliament of the United Kingdom in Lincolnshire constituencies